Tar...dun...ni (Cuneiform: , tar...dun...ni, or Tar…ni, …birini, …irpirin) son of Ikki (also reads Ikkibshakhmat, or Ikkipshakhmat), was a king, prince, ruler, or high-ranking official of the Zagros mountains area, circa 2000 BC. Although "Tardunni" is the way his name has been traditionally deciphered, he may have been called differently: it has been proposed that he was rather called Lisir Pirini, son of Ikkid Samad.

He is mainly known from a rock relief discovered in the valley of the Diyala river, in the Belula Pass, near the Lake of Darbandikhan, on the Horen Shekhan mountain (Kurdish: هۆرێن و شێخان; Arabic هورين- شيخان), in the extreme northeast of Iraq, near the border with Iran.

Very little is known about Tardunni. He was probably a ruler of the Lullubi mountain tribe. Some of their reliefs are known about 55 kilometers away, such as the Anubanini rock relief, which are very similar to the relief of Tardunni. Another opinion suggests that he was a Gutian.

In his relief, he is seen wearing weapons and trampling enemies. On the side, the relief has an inscription in the Akkadian language, invoking the protection of the deities Shamash and Adad:

See also
 Video of Tardunni's rock-relief at Darband-i Belula on YouTube.

References

Middle Eastern monarchs
21st-century BC monarchs